José Luis Valencia Murillo (born March 19, 1982 in Quininde, Esmeraldas) is a retired Ecuadorian footballer.

Club career
Prior to going back to play in Ecuador, he played for a number of clubs in Germany (Wuppertal), Netherlands (Ajax, N.E.C., Willem II, Eindhoven), Uruguay (Deportivo Maldonado), as well as having spent his youth career at Delfín in his native country.

International career
He was called up for the Ecuador national team once in 2006, but did not play.

Honors
LDU Quito
Serie A: 2010

References

External links
 
 Profile at ecuafutbol.org

1982 births
Living people
People from Quinindé Canton
Association football defenders
Ecuadorian footballers
Delfín S.C. footballers
Deportivo Maldonado players
AFC Ajax players
NEC Nijmegen players
Willem II (football club) players
FC Eindhoven players
Wuppertaler SV players
L.D.U. Quito footballers
Ecuadorian Serie A players
Eredivisie players
Eerste Divisie players
3. Liga players
Ecuadorian expatriate footballers
Expatriate footballers in Uruguay
Expatriate footballers in the Netherlands
Expatriate footballers in Germany
Ecuadorian expatriate sportspeople in the Netherlands